DNK is the fourth studio album from French singer Aya Nakamura. It was released on 27 January 2023 through Warner Music France.
 
The album features guest appearances by SDM, Tiakola, Myke Towers and Kim. It was preceded by the single "SMS", which reached the top 20 in Nakamura's home country France, at number 16 then by "Baby", which reached the top 3 in Nakamura's home country France, at number 2, in Wallonia at number 27 and in Switzerland in 32.

Promotion 
Nakamura announced her album through a YouTube livestream on 6 January 2023, alongside brand new merch including Hoodies, T-shirts and CDs. She also announced the presale buying methods for her concert at the Accor Arena on 26 May 2023, which sold out almost immediately.

Track listing

Charts

References 

 

 
2023 albums
Aya Nakamura albums
Contemporary R&B albums